Lake Linden–Hubbell High School is a high school located in Lake Linden, Michigan, in the Upper Peninsula. The building houses 6th through 12th grade students, and is connected to the elementary school by a skywalk. Enrollment was at 241 students in grades 7–12. Students from neighboring areas such as Hubbell, Tamarack City, Bootjack, Traprock Valley, Gay, and Laurium attend the school. Recently, the school changed their mascot to be a lake, from the previous whiz kids.

History
The first one-room school house in Lake Linden was built in 1867. The building burned down and was rebuilt in 1881; in 1885 the first class graduated. The class was all females. In 1915, with the steady influx of students with the mining boom, a new building was built next to St. Joseph's Church on Calumet Street, and still stands today. The elementary school was built right behind the high school in 1998, and the two were connected with a skywalk. Major renovations to the gymnasium and auditorium took place in 2009.

Athletics
The Lake Linden-Hubell Lakes compete in the Copper Mountain Conference. School colors are navy and gold. For the school year 2019–20, the following Michigan High School Athletic Association (MHSAA) sanctioned sports were offered:

Baseball (boys)
Basketball (girls and boys)
Bowling (girls and boys)
Eight Player Football (boys)
Golf (girls and boys)
Gymnastics (girls)
Ice Hockey (boys)
Skiing (girls and boys)
Softball (girls)
Track and field (girls and boys)
Girls Upper Peninsula (UP) Champions - 1983, 1994, 2017, 2018, 2019 
Volleyball (girls)

References

Public high schools in Michigan
Schools in Houghton County, Michigan
Educational institutions established in 1867
1867 establishments in Michigan